is a Japanese manga artist. Asano created the acclaimed manga series Solanin, which was released as a feature film in Japan in April 2010, starring Aoi Miyazaki. He is also famous for the series Goodnight Punpun and Dead Dead Demon's Dededede Destruction.

Known for creating character-driven, realist stories, ranging from slice of life to psychological horror, Asano won first prize in the 2001 GX competition for young manga artists. In 2010, Yomiuri Shimbun described Asano as "one of the voices of his generation."

Works

 (2000)
 (2000)
 (2001)
 (2002 – 2004)
Licensed in North America by Viz Media.
 (2003 – 2005)
Licensed in North America by Fantagraphics Books.
 (2004 – 2005)
 (2005 – 2008)
 (2005 – 2006)
Licensed in North America by Viz Media. An additional epilogue chapter was included in a new edition published in Japan in October 2017.
 (2007 – 2013)
Licensed in North America by Viz Media.
 (2008 –  2011)
 (2009 – 2013)
Licensed in North America by Vertical.
 (2010)
Planet (2010)
 (2012)
 (2013)
 (2014 – 2022)
Licensed in North America by Viz Media.
Won the 66th Shogakukan Manga Award in the general category in 2021.
 (February 6, 2015)
 (2015 – 2018)
 (2016)
 (2016)
 (2017)
 (2018)
 (2018)
 (2020)

References

External links
 
 
 
 

 
1980 births
Living people
Manga artists from Ibaraki Prefecture